Prison Life of Fools was a South Korean television program that aired on tvN, as the first part of the Amazing Saturday lineup. It starred Lee Soo-geun, Jeong Hyeong-don, Kim Jong-min, Hwang Je-sung, Lee Sang-yeob, Jang Do-yeon, JB (Got7), Seungkwan (Seventeen) and Choi Ye-na (IZ*ONE), with Kim Tae-jin as the main host. The program aired every Saturday at 18:05 (KST) from March 16, 2019 until September 7, 2019.

On March 21, 2019 tvN confirmed that Han Bo-reum would join the show as a fixed cast member, starting from episode 5.

Program
The game of Mafia is played in the setting of a prison, for a total of ₩9,000,000 of custody money.

Rules
 Each round of mafia lasts 2 episodes from Rounds 1-12. As new rules would apply, each round of mafia will last only 1 episode starting from Round 13.
 There are 3 mafias to arrest, and there are only 4 voting rounds to arrest all 3 mafias. As new rules would apply, there are only 3 voting rounds starting from Round 13.
 There are up to 5 reformation activities to play from Rounds 1-12. As new rules would apply, there will be only 3 reformation activities to play starting from Round 13.
Acknowledgement of Roles:
 There are a total of 10 players from Rounds 1-7, and that number increased to 12 beginning Round 8. In Round 14 that number increased again to 14.
 Before the start of each round, the players each choose their own cells. They will check the card that is placed in each of the cells, acknowledging himself/herself as a mafia or a model prisoner without the other players knowing. The cards of the model prisoners contain a common keyword and the mafias do not know this particular keyword. No open revealing of the keyword is allowed through the round of mafia.
 An additional rule was added starting from Round 4. After choosing their cells, the players will undergo Mind Control Time. This is for the players to not distract one another while looking at the cards, giving those who are model prisoners some time to think about how to express the keyword if they happen to have lost a reformation activity, and giving those who are mafias some time to adjust their conditions. It is then revealed in episode 8 that during this time the mafias are actually discussing their strategies through a secret group chat found in the phones that are found together with their cards. Plus, after the third voting round ends, all players will enter their cells again, and this is when the mafias discuss their strategies again through the phones.
 From Rounds 1-10, the mafia distribution in both teams is fixed to 2 in one team and 1 in the other team. Starting from Round 11, besides the mafia distribution stated, it is also possible that all 3 mafias are from the same team.
First Impression Voting: Starting from Round 9, after the Mind Control Time, all players will each tell secretly who he/she thinks is one of the mafias based on first impression, without one another knowing. Multiple names can be said by 1 player. This does not affect any part of the whole game of mafia.
 Reformation Activities:
 The reformation activities played are team battles except for the third reformation activity, which is an individual battle.
 Every player in the winning team of each reformation activity obtains an extra vote.
 For individual reformation activity, the number of extra votes obtained varies.
 If there is a fifth reformation activity played, the winning team of this reformation activity can bring in one of the players of the opposing team and use the interrogation room, in hopes of finding the mafia through this player.
 Penalty:
 The losing team of each reformation activity will have to execute a penalty of expressing the keyword. 
 After the 1st, 3rd and 5th reformation activities, the keyword is expressed through drawings.
 After the 2nd and 4th reformation activities, the keyword is expressed through actions.
 However, for only after the 3rd reformation activity (which is an individual battle), all players that are not arrested, instead of only the losing team, will have to express the keyword through drawing.
 Voting:
 Voting of the mafias will start after the penalty. Each player votes for a player he/she thinks is a mafia by attaching a yellow Velcro strap to that player.
 There is no voting after the third reformation activity.
 The extra votes that are won through reformation activities are black Velcro straps. These can only be used in the final voting round (or in the special case where after every player has voted, there are at least 2 players who are tied for most voted and there has to be only 1 player to be the most voted in either of the first 3 voting rounds, these extra votes can be used to push 1 of the players to become the most voted, after listening to those players defending themselves from getting those extra votes).
 After Voting:
 The most voted player will be arrested, regardless of whether he/she is revealed to be a mafia or a model prisoner. The arrested players can continue to participate in the remaining reformation activities, but will have no voting rights for the subsequent voting round(s). However, from Round 5 of mafia, a new rule is added, which states that for the third enlightenment activity, the arrested players can take part and win extra votes to be used in only the final voting round.
 When a mafia has been arrested in a voting round, ₩3,000,000 will be divided in the following distribution: ₩2,000,000 will go to the team that won the reformation activity before this particular voting round and ₩1,000,000 will go to the team that lost.
 Mafia Death Note:
 This new rule began in Round 8.
 The mafias have to come to an agreement on 1 model prisoner to get arrested without any voting during the mafias' second strategic meeting, and he/she will have his/her current votes possessed taken away.
 The mafias can also choose not to use the Mafia Death Note at all.
 In the situation where there are 2 mafias left not arrested after 3 voting rounds, in the final voting round the top 2 most voted players will be arrested.
 The round is over when all 3 mafias are arrested. If there is at least 1 mafia still not arrested after all the voting rounds, the entire ₩9,000,000 will go to the mafias.

Reformation Activities

Team
Finger Land's Dance Princesses: Before the start of this reformation activity, each team will arrange the order of answering. The answering players (1 from each team in a round) watch the dance movements to a song by the finger dancing crew SonyToby. The answering players will move with their hyodo chairs to Kim Tae-jin. The first to reach him gets to answer first, and if that player answers the correct song name and its singer, the remaining 4 players of that player's team will have to sing the correct lyrics through the standing mics provided. If a player of one team sings the wrong lyrics to that song, the chance will go to the other team. The first team to sing 3 songs correctly wins the reformation activity. Starting from Round 12 of mafia, the team who answered the song name and its singer correctly first gets a "One More Time" card, which can be used if the singing players of the same team sang the wrong lyrics to get a second try thereafter.
 An alternate version of this reformation activity named Dance A Song was played from Rounds 6-9, where the choreographs would be demonstrated by 77-year-old Ji Byung-soo, who became famous for his performance of Son Dam-bi's Crazy at National Singing Contest.
 A second alternate version of this reformation activity named Lyrics Confusion Center was played from Round 12. However, instead of watching the fingers dance, the lyrics to a song will be shown, but are jumbled up. The answering player has to answer the correct song and its singer based on these jumbled lyrics. 
Scream of the Birth, Ageing, Illness and Death: This reformation activity will be played on acupuncture mats. All players will be barefooted (except for Round 9 of mafia, in each team, 1 player can wear socks that protect both his/her entire feet and 1 player can wear socks that protect half of both his/her entire feet).
Chicken Fight: For the first game, all players will go up on the field and the last player to survive wins the game for his/her team. For the second game, it will be of a 1-on-1 all-kill basis, and the last player to survive wins the game for his/her team. If it goes to the third game, each team will send 1 player and play, and the winner wins the reformation activity for his/her team.
Penalty Shootout: A player from one team chooses a player from the other team. Both players will start moving on the acupuncture mats at different starting points, with one going straight towards the ball and kick it, while the other going from the side to the goal post and attempt to save the kicked ball. If the player kicking the ball scores, that player will secure 1 point for his/her team. The 2 same players will then switch positions and repeat this again for the other team to attempt to score a point if the ball goes in. The team to reach 5 points first wins the reformation activity. 
Long Jump: Different from the other versions of the reformation activity, this version is an individual battle. Out of the players, the top 6 who jumped the furthest will each get an individual vote, with the first placed player being able to select 1 player to execute the drawing penalty, plus the bottom 5 will have to execute the drawing penalty.
Chinese Zodiac In My Ears: Each team will select a player from the opposing team and spin the wheel that consists of the animals of the Chinese Zodiac. The player will have to imitate the sound of the animal selected through the wheel spinning and play charades with the remaining players of his/her team. Each team will play 2 rounds and the team with more questions answered wins the reformation activity. Starting from Round 9 of Mafia, instead of just 1 member of each team, every member will have to imitate the sound of the animal selected through the wheel spinning, and switch to the next member of the team after the answer is guessed correctly.
 An alternate version of this reformation activity named From 1 To 10 It's All About Your Voice was played from Round 12 of mafia. The only difference compared to the original is that the wheel consists of 10 insects and animals, that are not from the Chinese Zodiac. 
 If both teams are tied after all the rounds are played (happens in Round 8 of mafia), the tiebreaker is done by spinning the wheel and whichever team that spun the wheel and landed on the Dragon wins the reformation activity.
Match Between The Barrier: This is a match played on the ground. 
Ping Pong: For each game, both teams will each send 2 players and share a big shirt together. Both players of each team have to move together as one. The team to reach 7 points first takes the game. The first team to take 2 games wins the reformation activity.
Curling: Each team has 5 of their players as slide stones and 2 pushing players. The team with its member nearer to the center wins the reformation activity.
The Ladder That Carries The Correct Answers: In each round, Kim Tae-jin will say out a keyword, and upon hearing it, both teams will take their ladders and fit their bodies in it. The first team to hit the bell on their side gets to answer the terms related to the keyword, and each member of the team has to answer in 3 seconds. If not, the team will have to return to the bell and switch direction of the ladder (i.e. the team's order of answering is reversed), and the opposing team will be given the chance to answer. The first team to have all the members answered takes the round, and the first team to win 3 rounds wins the reformation activity.
 Walking To The Words: As Kim Tae-jin gives the signal to start the game, all members will move off to the character board and then move off again to Kim Tae-jin to answer a word that can be formed with the characters on the character board. The word has to be in the Standard Korean Language Dictionary. If Kim Tae-jin accepts the answer, these characters will be taken away from the character board and given to the player answering that word. If not, the player has to walk another round to get another chance of answering. The word answered cannot be accepted if the player in front has already taken the character which the word required. The team with more characters wins the reformation activity.

Individual
 Challenge Kong Kong Bell: In each round, Kim Tae-jin will read out a question (either multiple-choice or open-ended) and after it is read out, all players will ride on their bouncy balls and move to him. The player who reaches him first gets to answer first. If he/she gave the wrong answer, he/she has to hit his/her own head with the toy hammer before moving back and the player behind gets the chance to answer. The player who gives the correct answer gets an additional vote plus a specific food provided. This will be played for 7 questions.
Delicious Chairs: All players will wear spectacles that require them to cross their eyes to be able to see, and dance to the music provided. When the signal is given, all players will move to the chairs (number is less than the players on the field) and attempt to sit on them. The players that did not manage to sit on the chairs are eliminated from the reformation activity and do not get to eat the food provided for the round. This will be played until it produces the top 3 players and the first placed player gets 3 votes, followed by 2 for the second placed player, and 1 for the third placed player.
 Box Shaman: All players will dance to the music provided and when the signal is given, all players will select the boxes that they want. They can exchange positions if they want. The boxes are either unbreakable or breakable (at times with cold water) upon sitting on them. The players who have sat on breakable boxes are eliminated from the reformation activity, and this will be played until it produces the top 3 players and the first placed player gets 3 votes, followed by 2 for the second placed player, and 1 for the third placed player.

Cast

Episodes

Statistics
Statistics recorded as of the end of Round 14.

Ratings

Notes

References

South Korean reality television series
2019 South Korean television series debuts
2019 South Korean television series endings
TVN (South Korean TV channel) original programming
Korean-language television shows